Berg interneringsleir (Berg internment camp) was a concentration camp near Tønsberg in Norway that served as an internment and transit center for political prisoners and Jews during the Nazi occupation of Norway.

Establishment
The camp at Berg was founded upon an initiative in the fall of 1941 from the Norwegian fascist Nasjonal Samling party, and with some opposition from the German occupying authorities, Wilhelm Rediess in particular. The main advocates for the camp were Minister of Justice Sverre Riisnæs, mayor Bjerck of Tønsberg, and head of the Hird in Vestfold, Eivind Wallestad. Police minister Jonas Lie approved the construction plans on June 12, 1942.

Vidkun Quisling had spoken of the camp at a speech in Horten on May 25, 1942 as an expression of his outrage of the Norwegian Constitution Day celebration among Norwegian patriots. He promised his political opposition that a "chicken coop" would be established for them.

The camp was planned to have a capacity of 3,000 prisoners but was never fully finished. It was unique among the camps in Norway in that it was run entirely by collaborating Norwegians under the authority of the Ministry of Police.

Prisoners
The first prisoners to Berg were a contingent of 60 male Jews that had been arrested on October 26, 1942. They arrived by train and were force-marched into the still-unfinished camp. The barracks were uninsulated, had no sanitary facilities, beds, or other furniture. Within two days there were 350 prisoners, under the administration of Leif Lindseth. They were told that anyone who tried to escape would be summarily shot; and that ten of their fellow inmates and their families would be shot in retribution.

During the month before their deportation, the Jewish prisoners were put to hard labor, expanding the camp. They worked seven days a week from 7:30 am to 8:30 pm, subsisting on a quarter loaf of bread, soup from flowers, and ersatz coffee.

The local Red Cross chapter, led by Anton Jervell, made attempts to provide relief to the prisoners with mixed success.

After most of the Jewish prisoners had been deported, several groups of political prisoners moved in. Conditions deteriorated after this, and disease became prevalent. In April 1943 conditions started to improve somewhat, but Berg was considered among the worst camps in Norway and far worse than Grini.

In addition to the 350 Jewish prisoners at Grini, 847 other prisoners spent time at Berg. During the winter of 1944/45, the camp reached its maximum population of 500-600 prisoners. Of the 280 Jewish prisoners who were sent from Berg to camps in Germany, seven survived.

Notable prisoners include:
Berthold Epstein
Victor Moritz Goldschmidt, 1942
Herman Sachnowitz
Ole Øisang, 1944–1945

As of 2015 only one Jewish prisoner at Berg during World War II was alive; his father (who was married to a Jew) was deported, while the son, was not deported because he had "a Norwegian wife"; Martin Mankowitz changed his last name to Meholm, after World War II.

Post-war use
After the war it was used for prisoners accused of having collaborated with the war-time fascist Quisling regime.

References

  
 

 
Nazi concentration camps in Norway
1942 establishments in Norway
Organizations established in 1942